The Apollo's belt, also known as Adonis belt or iliac furrows is a part of the human anatomy referring to the two shallow grooves of the human abdomen running from the iliac crest (hip bone) to the pubis. 

The shape of the grooves are formed by the inguinal ligament. The visibility of the belt is caused by a low body fat percentage, rather than the creation of new muscle. 

The term "iliac furrow" does not appear in any of the abstracts indexed by PubMed. It is not a currently defined term in Terminologia Anatomica, though it has been used as a formal anatomical term in the past. The term is, however, encountered in modern art history descriptions.

References

Human anatomy